Radio Essex may refer to:

BBC Essex, the BBC local radio station
Radio Essex (pirate), the 1960s offshore pirate radio broadcaster owned by Roy Bates
Radio Essex, a local radio station for Essex, England via DAB and Mid and South Essex via FM
Heart Essex (Chelmsford & Southend), formerly Essex Radio